Telesilla was an ancient Greek lyric poet from Argos, active in the fifth century BC.  She is known for her supposed role in the defence of Argos in 494 BC, which is doubted by modern scholars.  Only a few fragments of her poetry survive, several of which reference the gods Apollo and Artemis.  The longest surviving fragment, only two lines, is quoted by the grammarian Hephaestion to illustrate the Telesillan metre, named after her.  She was apparently famous in antiquity, included by Antipater of Thessalonica in his canon of women poets; in the twentieth century she inspired a poem by the imagist poet H.D.

Life
Little is known of Telesilla's life.  She was from the Peloponnesian city of Argos.  A tradition reported by both Plutarch and Pausanias associates her with the defence of the city after the Battle of Sepeia in 494 BC; according to Eusebius her floruit was around 450 BC.  If both these dates are correct, she would have lived a relatively long life. Alternatively, Maria Elisabetta Colonna has proposed that she was born . Plutarch says that Telesilla was from an aristocratic family; Martin Litchfield West suggests that she held a hereditary priesthood, as names beginning "Telesi–" were sometimes associated with such families.

Plutarch reports that Telesilla was sickly; on the instructions of an oracle she became a poet, and was cured.  According to both Plutarch and Pausanias, when Cleomenes I of Sparta attacked Argos in 494 BC and defeated the Argive army at Sepeia, Telesilla organised the old men, slaves, and women of the city to defend it until the Spartans withdrew.  Plutarch says that Telesilla's victory was celebrated by the festival of Hybristica.  The battle is described by Herodotus, who does not mention Telesilla's defence of the city, and modern scholars mostly doubt the historicity of the story.  It is generally believed to be invented to explain a Delphic oracle which referred to the female driving out the male; the inclusion of Telesilla in the legend was perhaps inspired by something in her poetry.  However, some scholars such as R. A. Tomlinson and Jennifer Martinez Morales have argued that the story of women defending the city is plausible, though Tomlinson suggests that Telesilla's role was exaggerated.

Poetry

Nine fragments of Telesilla's poetry survive in quotation or paraphrase, with only one being longer than a single word.  What little survives suggests that, like Corinna, Telesilla concentrated on local legends.  Both Pausanias and Plutarch state that she was well regarded by women in particular, and her surviving fragments suggest that she was interested in women's lives.  Five fragments of her poetry relate to the gods Artemis and Apollo, and one apparently comes from a poem about the wedding of Zeus and Hera.  According to Maximus of Tyre, Telesilla's poetry inspired the Argives.  Umbertina Lisi suggested that this referred to war poetry, though Telesilla's surviving fragments are religious rather than martial.

A glyconic meter, the Telesillan, was named for her.  The longest surviving fragment of Telesilla is two lines quoted by the grammarian Hephaestion to illustrate this meter, about the myth of Alpheus.  It is addressed to "maidens" (κοραι), and was possibly a choral poem written for performance at a local festivals, used in the education of girls of noble families.

Telesilla's poetry was apparently admired in antiquity.  According to Eusebius she was as famous as Bacchylides, and Antipater of Thessalonica included her in his canon of nine women poets.  According to Pausanias, there was a stele to Telesilla in front of the temple of Aphrodite in Argos which depicted her holding a helmet and with her poems on the ground around her, and Tatian reports that Niceratus sculpted her.

In the modern world, Telesilla inspired H.D.'s poem "Telesila", and she is included in Judy Chicago's Heritage Floor, accompanying the place setting for Aspasia in The Dinner Party.

References

Works cited

External links
 Project Continua: Biography of Telesilla  Project Continua is a web-based multimedia resource dedicated to the creation and preservation of women's intellectual history from the earliest surviving evidence into the 21st Century.

Women in ancient Greek warfare
Ancient Greek lyric poets
Ancient Argives
5th-century BC poets
5th-century BC Greek women
5th-century BC women writers
5th-century BC writers
Ancient Greek women poets